Hungary is subdivided administratively into 19 counties (vármegyék, singular: vármegye) and the capital city (főváros) Budapest. The counties are further subdivided into 174 districts (járások, singular: járás). The capital Budapest is subdivided into 23 districts (kerületek, singular: kerület).

There are 25 cities with county rights (megyei jogú városok, singular: megyei jogú város), sometimes called urban counties. The local authorities of these towns have extended powers but they are not independent territorial units.

List of counties 

There are seven towns with county's rights in addition to the county seats:

 Baja (Bács-Kiskun county)
 Dunaújváros (Fejér county)
 Esztergom (Komárom-Esztergom county)
 Érd (Pest county)
 Hódmezővásárhely (Csongrád-Csanád county)
 Nagykanizsa (Zala county)
 Sopron (Győr-Moson-Sopron county)

Codes of the counties

See also

 Regions of Hungary
 Districts of Hungary (from 2013) – Subregions of Hungary (until 2013)
 Ranked list of Hungarian counties
 List of cities and towns of Hungary
 NUTS:HU
 Administrative divisions of the Kingdom of Hungary (until 1918)
 Counties of the Kingdom of Hungary
 Administrative divisions of the Kingdom of Hungary (1941–44)

Notes

References

External links
Gazetteer of Hungary, 2012
Gazetteer of Hungary, 1 January 2019
ISO 3166 Country Codes
MAGYARORSZÁG – NU
Presentation of E.164 National Numbering Plan (NNP) for Hungary (country code +36)

 
Subdivisions of Hungary
Hungary, Counties
Hungary 1
Counties, Hungary
Counties